Achilles is a ballad opera by John Gay, first performed at the Theatre Royal, Covent Garden in 1733, a year after Gay's death, with Gay's associate John Rich as producer.

Background
The opera is a burlesque parody of the story of Achilles on Skyros, based on legends of Achilles as related by  Bion, Ovid, and Statius (notably the latter's Achilleid). Unsuccessful attempts were made at the time to interpret the work as a political satire (as was Gay's The Beggar's Opera) but no convincing case has been made for this. Unlike The Beggar's Opera and Gay's other ballad opera, Polly, Achilles uses not only tunes from popular music, but also employs melodies from concertante works of Arcangelo Corelli. Achilles proved popular; the first performance alone brought John Rich over £200, and the opera ran for over a month after its premiere on 10 February 1733.

Roles

Synopsis
The opera takes place on the isle of Skyros, (called "Scyros" in the libretto). Achilles is disguised by his mother the goddess Thetis as Pyrrha, a woman, in an attempt to prevent him going to Troy, where she is convinced he will die. However, he falls in love with Deidamia, the daughter of the island's king, Lycomedes. Various misunderstandings follow, including an attempt by Lycomedes to rape "Pyrrha". Lycomedes's wife, Theaspe, seeks to dispose of "Pyrrha" by marrying "her" to her nephew Periphas; at which Achilles complains "I have no sooner escap'd being ravish'd but I am immediately to be made a Wife". Deidamia becomes pregnant, and Ulysses recognizes Achilles. The truth is out and Achilles and Deidamia marry; Achilles then leaves to take part in the Trojan Wars.

References
Citations

Sources
Baldwin, Olive and Thelma Wilson (2008). "Norsa, Hannah",  in Oxford Dictionary of National Biography online, accessed 3 July 2017 .
Gay, John (1733). Achilles:  an opera, London: J. Watts. In University of North Texas digital library, accessed 4 July 2017.
Lewis, Peter Elfed (1972). "John Gay's 'Achilles': The Burlesque Element", in Ariel, vol. 3 no. 1, pp. 17-28, accessed 4 July 2017.
Winton, Calhoun (2015). John Gay and the London Theatre. Lexington: University Press of Kentucky. 

Operas
Works by John Gay
1733 operas
Ballad operas
English-language operas
Operas set in fictional, mythological and folkloric settings
Opera world premieres at the Theatre Royal, Covent Garden
Cultural depictions of Achilles
Works based on the Iliad
Operas based on works by Homer
Operas based on Metamorphoses